Xenocephalus is a genus of bony fish from the family Uranoscopidae, the stargazers. They are found in the Indo-Pacific region and are benthic, ambush predators.

Species
The following species are classified within Xenocephalus:

Xenocephalus armatus Kaup, 1858
Xenocephalus australiensis (Kishimoto, 1989)
Xenocephalus cribratus (Kishimoto, 1989)
Xenocephalus egregious (Jordan & Thompson, 1905)
Xenocephalus elongatus (Temminck & Schlegel, 1843)
Xenocephalus innotabilis (Waite, 1904)

References

Uranoscopidae